Longitarsus eminus is a species of beetle from Chrysomelidae family that can be found in Asian countries such as Afghanistan, Iran, Iraq, Israel, and Turkey.

References

E
Beetles described in 1967
Beetles of Asia